Batié may refer to:

Batié, Burkina Faso
Batié, Cameroon
Batié department, Burkina Faso